Walter N. Lee (1904 – 16 February 1967) was a British trade union leader.

Lee began working in a cotton spinning room at the age of twelve.  He joined the Oldham Operative Cotton Spinners' Association, eventually becoming its assistant secretary, then, in 1953, its general secretary.

The Oldham Spinners were affiliated to the Amalgamated Association of Operative Cotton Spinners, and in 1960 Lee was additionally elected as its president.  This was followed, in 1965, by his election as general secretary of the Spinners' Union.

Lee was also active in the Labour Party, and from 1959 served as an elected auditor of the party's accounts.  He also served on the Textile Council, as a magistrate, and on the Oldham Health Executive Committee.

References

1904 births
1967 deaths
General Secretaries of the Amalgamated Association of Operative Cotton Spinners
People from Oldham
Presidents of the Amalgamated Association of Operative Cotton Spinners